2016 is the 57th season of the Professional Bowlers Association (PBA) Tour. There were 26 singles title events, two doubles title events, and two team events on the 2016 schedule.

Tournament schedule and recaps
For the eighth year in a row, the PBA held multiple fall North American events in one location, at the GEICO PBA World Series of Bowling VIII (WSOB VIII).  Taking place in Reno, Nevada for the second straight season, the event included four "animal" oil pattern events (Cheetah, Chameleon, Scorpion and Shark). While each provide individual PBA titles, the four pattern tournaments in WSOB VIII also served as initial qualifying for the PBA World Championship. The top 25% of players in total pinfall over the 32 games of qualifying (8 games per pattern tournament) moved on to the PBA World Championship cashers round, and bowled an additional six games of qualifying on the PBA World Championship oil pattern to determine the top 24. Three additional match play rounds of eight games each determined the field for the televised finals. The WSOB field announced on November 16 included participants from a record 22 countries.

Several international tour stops, which are part of the World Bowling Tour (WBT), were again part of the PBA schedule. As in 2015, a PBA title was awarded for any qualifying WBT tournaments won by a PBA member. For the second straight season, some tournaments formerly consigned as PBA Regional Tour stops now qualified the winner to earn a PBA title in addition to a minimum $10,000 top prize for each event. These nine tour stops were designated as "Xtra Frame" tournaments, because they are broadcast exclusively (start-to-finish) on the PBA's Xtra Frame webcast service. For 2016, the Xtra Frame series had a rolling points list, with a $10,000 bonus given to the player with the most points after all eight Xtra Frame singles events were completed. (Note: The Xtra Frame series was shortened to seven singles events when the PBA Xtra Frame Tamarac Classic in Florida was cancelled due to Hurricane Matthew.) Tommy Jones was the bonus winner with 89 points, surpassing E. J. Tackett (84 points) in the final Xtra Frame event of the season.

After three seasons, the PBA dropped the "Summer Swing" series that had taken place in Milwaukee, Wisconsin (2013) and Shawnee, Oklahoma (2014–15), in favor of a Fall Swing series that took place September 5–11 in Allen Park, Michigan. Oil patterns and event structure, however, were the same as the previous Summer Swing series. The Swing features the shortest and longest oil patterns used in any PBA tournament (32-foot "Wolf" and 52-foot "Badger"), plus a 40-foot U.S. Open-style pattern ("Bear").

Season highlights
Young players dominated the major tournaments in 2016:
2015 PBA Rookie of the Year Jesper Svensson of Sweden won the PBA Fire Lake Tournament of Champions for his third title and first major. Svensson, who was just shy of his 21st birthday at the time, became the youngest player ever to win this tournament. The previous record-holder was Marshall Holman, who won the 1976 TOC at age 21.
 One week after Svensson's historic feat, Anthony Simonsen (age 19 years, 36 days) won the USBC Masters to become the youngest player to win a PBA major of any kind. Mike Aulby had held that distinction for over 36 years, having won the 1979 PBA National Championship at age 19 years, 83 days. The victory was Simonsen's first singles title, and second title overall.
 The PBA Players Championship, re-elevated to major status in 2016, was won by 24-year old Ontario native Graham Fach, who became the first bowler from Canada to win a PBA title.
 23-year old François Lavoie, a Canadian native who bowled collegiately at Wichita State University, won the 63rd U.S. Open, and rolled a 300 game in the semifinal match. It was the 26th perfect game in a televised PBA Tour event, and the first ever to be rolled in the televised finals of the U.S. Open.
 In the season's final major event on December 11, 24-year old E. J. Tackett won the PBA World Championship in Reno, NV. The victory was Tackett's first career major, his fifth title overall, and his fourth title of the 2016 season.

Additional highlights:
 The GoBowling.com Dallas Strikers, a five-player team headed by player-manager Norm Duke, rolled a nationally televised Baker format 300 game in the semifinal round of the PBA League Elias Cup event (broadcast May 1 on ESPN). This is the first Baker format perfect game recorded in PBA history. Although the standard $10,000 bonus that is given for a televised 300 game by an individual did not apply, the PBA retroactively awarded the bonus to Duke and his teammates (Tommy Jones, Bill O'Neill, Shawn Maldonado and B.J. Moore) on June 30, 2016.

Awards for the 2016 season were as follows:
 GEICO Chris Schenkel PBA Player of the Year: E. J. Tackett
 Harry Golden PBA Rookie of the Year: François Lavoie
 Steve Nagy Sportsmanship Award: Tom Smallwood
 Tony Reyes Community Service Award: Rhino Page
 George Young High Average Award: Jesper Svensson (226.07)

Tournament summary
Below is a schedule of events for the 2016 PBA Tour season. Major tournaments are in bold. Career PBA title numbers for winners are shown in parenthesis (#).

C: broadcast on CBS Sports Network
E: broadcast on ESPN
E2: broadcast on ESPN2
X: broadcast on the PBA's Xtra Frame webcast service
 *Tournament finals were held in December 2015, but this counts as a 2016 season title. There was an earlier Mark Roth-Marshall Holman doubles tournament in February 2015 that counted as a 2015 title.
 (NQ) Accepted 8 pins handicap per game offered to female competitors by the tournament committee, and thus was not eligible to earn a PBA or WBT title.
 (a) Denotes amateur bowler; did not qualify for a PBA title.
 + The Dallas Strikers earned an additional $10,000 for rolling a perfect game in the semifinal round.
 # François Lavoie earned an additional $10,000 for rolling a perfect game in the semifinal match.

References

External links
PBA 2016 Season Schedule
2016 PBA International-WBT Season Schedule
2016 PBA TV Schedule

Professional Bowlers Association seasons
2016 in bowling